Arthur Lyon Cross (November 14, 1873 – June 21, 1940) was an American historian specializing in English history. Born in Portland, Maine, he received his doctorate from Harvard and joined the faculty of the University of Michigan in 1899.

In 1914, his best-known work, A History of England and Greater Britain, was published. His other works include The Anglican Episcopate and the American Colonies, which was based on his Ph.D. thesis, and A Recent History of English Laws.

Sources
 History of the University of Michigan, 1906, by Burke Aaron Hinsdale, p. 357
 Arthur Lyon Cross Papers  1897-1940, Bentley Historical Library
 Dr. A.L. Cross To Lecture

1873 births
1940 deaths
American historians
Harvard University alumni
University of Michigan faculty